Sher Dil (Urdu/Punjabi:  "Lionheart") is a 1990 Pakistani action film, directed by Hasan Askari and produced by Rasheed Sajid. The film stars Sultan Rahi, Gori, Adeeb and Mustafa Qureshi.

Cast
 Sultan Rahi - Noori
 Mustafa Qureshi - (police officer) Ikram Ullah Khan Niazi
 Gori - (love interest of Noori)
 Ali Abbas - Haidari
 Shahida Mini
 Muneeza Sheikh (sister) Noori
 Haq Nawaz
 Rashid Mehmood - Master Ji
 Humayun Qureshi - Jemy
 Altaf Khan - Jageerdar
 Adeeb - 
 Bahar
 Akhtar Shad
 Zahir Shah - 
 Sher Khan
 Raseela

Music
The music of the film is by Wajahat Attre. The lyrics are penned by Waris Ludhianvi and performed by singers Noor Jehan and Humaira Channa.

References

External links
 Sher Dil - 1990 Pakistani film

1990s crime action films
Pakistani crime action films
1990 films
Punjabi-language Pakistani films
1990s Punjabi-language films